The Paraset was a small, low-power, thermionic valve, CW-only radio transmitter-receiver supplied to the resistance groups in France, Belgium and the Netherlands during World War II.

History
The Paraset was one of the first successful miniaturized radio sets for Britain's Special Operations Executive which conducted espionage and other activities behind German lines during World War II.

The set, known as the Whaddon Mark VII, was used for clandestine radio communication primarily in Norway and Europe, developed at the Royal Signals Special Communications Unit workshops at Little Horwood and the workshops of Whaddon Hall, Buckinghamshire in the early stages of World War II. The equipment is known as the "Paraset" because it was dropped by parachute for field agents.

A number of amateur radio operators build and operate replicas of the Paraset.

Specifications
Receiver coverage: 3.0 to 7.6 MHz, one band.
Transmitter coverage: slightly more than 3.0 to 7.6 MHz, two bands, selectable. 
Power output: 4 to 5 watts.

See also 
Vintage amateur radio
Military Wireless Museum in the Midlands

References

External links 
G4BXD Original Paraset photo
IK0MOZ Italian Paraset Project
Paraset.nl Paraset project and info from The Netherlands

Amateur radio transceivers
Military radio systems
Special Operations Executive
Saboteurs
World War II British electronics
British military radio